A  ("colonel general") was the second-highest general officer rank in the German Reichswehr and Wehrmacht, the Austro-Hungarian Common Army, the East German National People's Army and in their respective police services.  The rank was equal to a four-star full general but below a general field marshal. The rank was equivalent to a Generaladmiral in the Kriegsmarine until 1945 or to a Flottenadmiral in the Volksmarine until 1990. It was the highest ordinary military rank and the highest military rank awarded in peacetime; the higher rank of general field marshal was awarded only in wartime by the head of state. In general, a Generaloberst had the same privileges as a general field marshal.

A literal translation of Generaloberst would be "uppermost general", but it is often translated as "colonel-general" by analogy to Oberst, "colonel", such as in countries in which the rank was adopted like Russia (general-polkovnik). "Oberst" derives from the superlative form of Germanic ober (upper), cognate to English over and so "superior general" might be a more idiomatic rendering.

The rank was created in 1854, originally for Emperor William I, the Prince of Prussia, because members of the royal family were traditionally not promoted to the rank of field marshal and it was limited to wartime.
In the 19th century, the rank was largely honorary and usually held only by members of the princely families or the Governor of Berlin. The regular promotion of professional officers to the grade did not begin until 1911.

Since the rank of Generalfeldmarschall was reserved for wartime promotions, the additional distinction of a "Colonel general with the rank of field marshal" was created. Such generals were entitled to wear three pips and a marshal's crossed batons on their shoulder boards, compared to the three pips of a Colonel General; however, this was changed to four pips in 1911. 

Generaloberst was the second-highest general officer rank, below field marshal, in the Prussian Army as well as in the German Empire (1871–1918), the Weimar Republic (1921–1933), the Wehrmacht (which included the Luftwaffe, established in 1935) of Nazi Germany (1933–45) and the East German Nationale Volksarmee (1949–1991). As military ranks were often used for other uniformed services, the rank was also used by the Waffen-SS and the Ordnungspolizei of Nazi Germany and the Volkspolizei and Stasi of East Germany. In East Germany, the rank was junior to the general of the army (Armeegeneral), as well as to the briefly-extant and never-awarded rank of Marschall der DDR.

Austro-Hungarian Army

In 1915 the Generaloberst – Vezérezredes rank was introduced to the Austro-Hungarian Common Army. It was the second highest behind the Feldmarschall – Tábornagy rank.

See also 

 Erzherzog Joseph Ferdinand von Österreich-Toskana (1872–1942)
 Friedrich Graf von Beck-Rzikowsky (1830–1920)
 Eduard Graf Paar (1837–1919)
 Arthur Freiherr von Bolfras (1838–1922)
 Friedrich Freiherr von Georgi (1852–1926)
 Karl Freiherr von Pflanzer-Baltin (1855–1925)
 Viktor Graf Dankl von Krasnik (1854–1941)
 Karl Tersztyánszky von Nádas (1854–1921)
 Adolf Freiherr von Rhemen zu Barensfeld (1855–1932)
 Paul Freiherr Puhallo von Brlog (1856–1926)
 Erzherzog Leopold Salvator von Österreich-Toskana (1863–1931)
 Karl Graf von Kirchbach auf Lauterbach (1856–1939)
 Karl Georg Graf Huyn (1857–1938)
 Hermann Kusmanek von Burgneustädten (1860–1934)
 Karl Křitek (1861–1928)
 Wenzel Freiherr von Wurm (1859–1921)
 Samuel Freiherr von Hazai (1851–1942)
 Leopold Freiherr von Hauer (1854–1933)
 Viktor Graf von Scheuchenstuel (1857–1938)
 Stephan Freiherr Sarkotić von Lovčen (1858–1939)
 Josef Freiherr Roth von Limanowa-Łapanów (1859–1927)
 Arthur Freiherr Arz von Straußenburg (1857–1935)
 Hugo Martiny von Malastów (1860–1940)
 Rudolf Freiherr Stöger-Steiner von Steinstätten (1861–1921)
 Alois Fürst Schönburg-Hartenstein (1858–1944)

German Empire
Rank insignia of the German Empire 1871 until 1918, here shoulder strap of the German Imperial Army: twisted of silver- and golden-braids with three stars to "Colonel general" (equivalent to four-star rank, today: OF-9).

Bavarian Army
 December 27, 1911 – Carl von Horn (1847–1923), Minister of War
 August 1, 1914 – Otto Kreß von Kressenstein (1850–1929), Minister of War
 April 9, 1918 – Felix von Bothmer (1852–1937), commander-in chief in WW I

Prussian Army

 March 20, 1854 – Wilhelm of Preußen (1797–1888), with the special rank of Generalfeldmarschall
 June 16, 1871 – Albrecht of Preußen (1809–1872), with the special rank of Generalfeldmarschall
 September 2, 1873 – August Prinz von Württemberg (1813–1885), Commander and Governor of Berlin
 June 25, 1888 – Frederick I, Grand Duke of Baden (1826–1907), with the special rank of Generalfeldmarschall, Inspector of the Army
 September 19, 1888 – Alexander August Wilhelm von Pape (1813–1895), with the special rank of Generalfeldmarschall, Commander in den Marken and Governor of Berlin
 December 21, 1889 – Charles Alexander, Grand Duke of Saxe-Weimar-Eisenach (1818–1901)
 March 20, 1890 – Otto von Bismarck (1815–1898), with the special rank of Generalfeldmarschall à la suite of the Army, 1st Chancellor of Germany
 October 18, 1901 – Leopold, Prince of Hohenzollern (1835–1905)
 March 22, 1902 – Adolphe, Grand Duke of Luxembourg (1817–1905)
 September 15, 1905 – Bernhard III, Duke of Saxe-Meiningen (1851–1928), with the special rank of Generalfeldmarschall, Inspector of the Army
 September 15, 1905 – Frederick II, Grand Duke of Baden (1857–1928), with the special rank of Generalfeldmarschall, Inspector of the Army
 September 13, 1906 – Ernst Rudolf Max Edler von der Planitz (1836–1910), Inspector General of the Cavalry
 September 28, 1907 – Ernst I, Duke of Saxe-Altenburg (1826–1908), with the special rank of Generalfeldmarschall of the Prussian Army
 September 18, 1908 – Hans von Plessen (1841–1929), with the special rank of Generalfeldmarschall, Adjutant General of the Kaiser and Commander of the Großes Hauptquartier ("Great Headquarters")
 4. September 4, 1909 – Prince Henry of Prussia (1862–1929), with the special rank of Generalfeldmarschall, Großadmiral, Inspector general of the Navy, à la suite of the Prussian Army
 September 10, 1910 – Prince Friedrich Leopold of Prussia (1865–1931), à la suite
 January 22, 1911 – Prince Christian of Schleswig-Holstein (1831–1917), à la suite
 January 27, 1911 – Gustav von Kessel (1846–1918), Adjutant General of the Kaiser, Commander in the Marken, and Governor of Berlin
 September 13, 1912 – Karl von Bülow (1846-1921), Army Commander, promoted to Generalfeldmarschal in 1915
 January 1, 1913 – Hermann von Eichhorn (1948-1918) Army Group Commander, promoted to Generalfeldmarschal in 1917
 June 16, 1913 – Maximilian von Prittwitz (1848–1917), Army Commander
 June 16, 1913 – Friedrich von Scholl (1846–1928), Adjutant General of the Kaiser
 January 27, 1914 – Josias von Heeringen (1850–1926), Army Commander
 January 27, 1914 – Helmuth von Moltke the Younger (1848–1916), Chief of the 1st Oberste Heeresleitung
 January 27, 1914 – Alexander von Kluck (1846–1934), Army Commander
 December 3, 1914 – August von Mackensen (1849-1945), Army Commander, promoted to Generalfeldmarschal in 1915
 December 3, 1914 – Remus von Woyrsch (1947-1920), Army Group Commander, promoted to Generalfeldmarschal in 1917
 December 24, 1914 – Moritz von Bissing (1844–1917), Governor general of Belgium
 December 24, 1914 – Ludwig von Falkenhausen (1844–1936), Army Commander
 January 27, 1915 – Karl von Einem (1853–1934), Army Commander
 February 20, 1916 – Alexander von Linsingen (1850–1935), Army Commander
 January 27, 1917 – Günther Graf von Kirchbach (1850–1925), Commander of Heeresgruppe Kiew
 January 27, 1917 – Richard von Schubert (1850–1933), Army Commander
 January 27, 1918 – Hans von Beseler (1850–1921), Army Commander
 March 22, 1918 – Max von Boehn (1850–1921), Army Group Commander
 April 10, 1918 – Moriz Freiherr von Lyncker (1853–1932), Chief of the Military Cabinet

Royal Saxon Army
 December 21, 1889 – Carl Alexander Großherzog of Sachsen (1818–1901)
 September 15, 1905 – Bernhard Erbprinz of Sachsen-Meiningen (1851–1928)
 September 28, 1907 – Ernst I, Duke of Saxe-Altenburg (1826–1908)
 September 4, 1909 – Prince Henry of Prussia (1862–1929)
 December 17, 1910 – Max Freiherr of Hausen (1846–1922), Minister-President, Army Commander
 January 23, 1918 – Karl Ludwig d'Elsa (1849–1922), Army Commander
 January 23, 1918 – Hans von Kirchbach (1849–1928), Army Commander

Army of Württemberg
 February 25, 1913 – Philipp Herzog von Württemberg (1838–1917), à la suite of the Army of Württemberg
 September 24, 1913 – Albrecht Herzog von Württemberg (1865–1939), later also Prussian Generalfeldmarschall
 February 25, 1918 – Otto von Marchtaler (1854–1920), Minister of War

Weimar Republic

Reichswehr
 January 1, 1926 – Hans von Seeckt (1866–1936), Chief of the Heeresleitung
 January 1, 1930 – Wilhelm Heye (1869–1947), Chief of the Heeresleitung
 1934 – Kurt Freiherr von Hammerstein-Equord (1878–1943), Chief der Heeresleitung

Nazi Germany

Wehrmacht

The equivalent ranks of a colonel general were in the:
 Kriegsmarine – Generaladmiral
 Waffen-SS – SS-Oberst-Gruppenführer und Generaloberst der Waffen-SS
 Schutzstaffel (SS) – Oberst-Gruppenführer
 Sturmabteilung (SA) – No equivalent
 Ordnungspolizei (Orpo) – Generaloberst der Polizei ("Colonel general of police")

Heer
 April 20, 1936 – Werner von Fritsch (1880–1939)
 November 1, 1938 – Ludwig Beck (1880–1944)
 December 31, 1938 – Wilhelm Adam (1877–1949)
 October 1, 1939 – Johannes Blaskowitz (1883–1948)
 July 19, 1940 – Friedrich Dollmann (1882–1944)
 July 19, 1940 – Heinz Guderian (1888–1954)
 July 19, 1940 – Franz Halder (1884–1972)
 July 19, 1940 – Hermann Hoth (1885–1971)
 July 19, 1940 – Adolf Strauß (1879–1973)
 July 19, 1940 – Nikolaus von Falkenhorst (1885–1968)
 July 19, 1940 – Friedrich Fromm (1888–1945)
 July 19, 1940 – Curt Haase (1881–1943)
 July 19, 1940 – Erich Hoepner (1886–1944)
 July 19, 1940 – Eugen Ritter von Schobert (1883–1941)
 January 1, 1942 – Georg-Hans Reinhardt (1887–1963)
 January 1, 1942 – Rudolf Schmidt (1886–1957)
 April 1, 1942 – Richard Ruoff (1883–1967)
 June 1, 1942 – Eduard Dietl (1890–1944)
 July 3, 1942 – Georg Lindemann (1884–1963)
 December 3, 1942 – Hans-Jürgen von Arnim (1889–1962)
 January 1, 1943 – Gotthard Heinrici (1886–1971)
 January 1, 1943 – Hans von Salmuth (1888–1962)
 Januar 30, 1943 – Walter Heitz (1878–1944)
 July 6, 1943 – Eberhard von Mackensen (1889–1969)
 September 1, 1943 – Heinrich Gottfried von Vietinghoff-Scheel (1887–1952)
 September 1, 1943 – Karl-Adolf Hollidt (1891–1985)
 February 1, 1944 – Alfred Jodl (1890–1946)
 February 1, 1944 – Erwin Jaenecke (1890–1960)
 February 1, 1944 – Walter Weiß (1890–1967)
 February 1, 1944 – Kurt Zeitzler (1895–1963)
 April 1, 1944 – Josef Harpe (1887–1968)
 April 1, 1944 – Lothar Rendulic (1887–1971)
 April 20, 1944 – Hans-Valentin Hube (1890–1944)
 July 23, 1944 – Johannes Frießner (1892–1971)
 August 15, 1944 – Erhard Raus (1889–1956)
 May 1, 1945 – Carl Hilpert (1888–1947)

Luftwaffe

 July 19, 1940 – Alfred Keller (1882–1974)
 July 19, 1940 – Hans-Jürgen Stumpff (1889–1968)
 July 19, 1940 – Ernst Udet (1896–1941)
 July 19, 1940 – Ulrich Grauert (1889–1941)
 July 19, 1940 – Hubert Weise (1884–1950)
 May 3, 1941 – Alexander Löhr (1885–1947)
 April 1, 1942 – Hans Jeschonnek (1899–1943)
 November 1, 1942 – Günther Rüdel (1883–1950)
 February 16, 1943 – Bruno Loerzer (1891–1960)
 Jun 11, 1943 – Otto Deßloch (1889–1977)
 July 13, 1944 – Kurt Student (1890–1978)
 July 22, 1944 (posthum) – Günther Korten (1898–1944)

Waffen-SS

SS-Oberst-Gruppenführer and Generaloberst of the Waffen-SS:
 1942 – Sepp Dietrich (1892–1966)
 1944 – Paul Hausser (1880–1972)

German Police

SS-Oberst-Gruppenführer and Generaloberst of the Police:
 1942 – Kurt Daluege (1897–1946)

German Democratic Republic (East Germany)

National People's Army
In the Land Forces and Air Forces of the National People's Army, as well as the Border Troops of the German Democratic Republic Generaloberst was in line to Soviet military doctrine third general officer rank in that particular general's rank group. Pertaining to the NATO-Rangcode it might have been comparable to the three-star rank (OF-8).
The equivalent to the Generaloberst was Admiral of the  Volksmarine .
See also
Ranks of the National People's Army

 March 1, 1966 Kurt Wagner (1904–1989)
 March 1, 1972 Herbert Scheibe (1914–1991)
 March 1, 1976 Horst Stechbarth (1925–2016)
 October 7, 1977 Werner Fleißner (1922–1985)
 July 14, 1979 Erich Peter (1919–1987)
 October 7, 1979 Wolfgang Reinhold (1923–2012)
 October 7, 1979 Fritz Streletz (born 1926)
 March 1, 1986 Joachim Goldbach (1929–2008)
 March 1, 1987 Horst Brünner (1929–2008)
 October 7, 1988 Klaus-Dieter Baumgarten (1931–2008)
 October 7, 1989 Fritz Peter (born 1927)

Ministry of State Security
 February 1980 Bruno Beater (1914–1982)
 May 1986 Markus Wolf (1923–2006)
 February 1987 Rudi Mittig (1925–1994)
 1989 Werner Großmann (1929-2022)

Deutsche Volkspolizei (DVP)
 1962 Karl Maron (1903–1975)
 1987 Karl-Heinz Wagner (1928–2011)

See also
 Colonel general
 List of German colonel generals
 Comparative military ranks of World War I
 Comparative military ranks of World War II
 Ranks of the National People's Army

References 

1854 establishments in Prussia
Military of East Germany
Military ranks of Germany
German generals
Generals
Gen
Four-star officers of Nazi Germany
William I, German Emperor